Leander Paes and Adil Shamasdin were the defending champions but chose not to defend their title.

Gonzalo Escobar and Manuel Sánchez won the title after defeating Bradley Mousley and John-Patrick Smith 6–4, 6–4 in the final.

Seeds

Draw

References
 Main Draw

Torneo Internacional Challenger León - Doubles
2018 Doubles